A Mobile PCI Express Module (MXM) is an interconnect standard for GPUs (MXM Graphics Modules) in laptops using PCI Express created by MXM-SIG. The goal was to create a non-proprietary, industry standard socket, so one could easily upgrade the graphics processor in a laptop, without having to buy a whole new system or relying on proprietary vendor upgrades.

1st generation configurations
Smaller graphics modules can be inserted into larger slots, but type I and II heatsinks will not fit type III and above or vice versa.
The Alienware m5700 platform uses a heatsink that will fit Type I, II, & III cards without modification.

2nd generation configurations (MXM 3)
Smaller graphics modules can be inserted into larger slots. Heatsink mounting remains the same for type A and B modules.

MXM 3.1 was released in March 2012 and added PCIe 3.0 support.

Module compatibility
First generation modules are not compatible with second generation modules and vice versa.
First generation modules are fully backwards compatible.

Standard availability
MXM is no longer freely supplied by Nvidia but it is controlled by the MXM-SIG controlled by Nvidia. Only corporate clients are granted access to the standard. The MXM 2.1 specification is widely available. The initial 3.0 technical brief (not the actual spec) can be found here. The 3.1 Electromechanical specification can be found here

Compliance
A common misconception about MXM is that certain models of graphics cards (e.g. Nvidia GTX 980M) "is MXM 2.1", and therefore any notebook with a GTX 980M fully implements MXM 2.1. However, this is incorrect. While Nvidia defines a lot of MXM specifications, they do not manufacture or design MXM cards themselves, which mostly consist of a PCB with vRAM and an Nvidia or AMD GPU core. Therefore, any model of GPU can be manufactured in MXM, but a laptop released with any particular graphics card model may or may not implement MXM regardless. This is because it is the decision of the ODM whether or not to implement MXM, not Nvidia's or AMD's.

List of MXM cards

MXM 3.x cards

Other usage of the MXM conectors 

 
The Qseven computer-on-module form factor uses a MXM-II connector, while the SMARC computer-on-module form factor uses a MXM 3 connector. Both implementations are not in any way compatible with the MXM standard.

References

External links
 MXM-SIG
 [MXM Upgrade] - Site about MXM, with a table of some MXM laptops, detailed upgrade procedures and MXM cards for sale, no longer updated.
  - Nearly complete list of Acer laptops implementing MXM.

Peripheral Component Interconnect